Wahlenbergia luteola is a small herbaceous plant in the family Campanulaceae native to eastern Australia.

It blooms throughout the year producing blue-yellow-white flowers.

The species is found in New South Wales, Victoria and South Australia.

References

luteola
Flora of New South Wales
Flora of Victoria (Australia)
Flora of South Australia